Monte Jackson (born July 14, 1953) is a former American football player. Jackson played in the National Football League (NFL) between 1975 and 1983. He played college football at San Diego State University. Jackson prepped at St Augustine High School in San Diego.

1953 births
Living people
People from Sherman, Texas
American football cornerbacks
Los Angeles Rams players
Los Angeles Raiders players
Oakland Raiders players
National Conference Pro Bowl players
San Diego State Aztecs football players
Players of American football from Texas